Hornbrook is a census-designated place (CDP) in Siskiyou County, California, United States.  Its population is 266 as of the 2020 census, up from 248 from the 2010 census.  It was named by the Southern Pacific Railroad in 1886, derived from the brook that ran through David Horn's property.

Geography
Hornbrook is located at  (41.909594, -122.557628).

Climate
This region experiences warm (but not hot) and dry summers, with no average monthly temperatures above 71.6 °F.  According to the Köppen Climate Classification system, Hornbrook has a warm-summer Mediterranean climate, abbreviated "Csb" on climate maps.

Demographics

2010
The 2010 United States Census reported that Hornbrook had a population of 248. The racial makeup of Hornbrook was 195 (78.6%) White, 0 (0.0%) African American, 15 (6.0%) Native American, 0 (0.0%) Asian, 0 (0.0%) Pacific Islander, 10 (4.0%) from other races, and 28 (11.3%) from two or more races. Hispanic or Latino of any race were 19 persons (7.7%).

The Census reported that 248 people (100% of the population) lived in households, 0 (0%) lived in non-institutionalized group quarters, and 0 (0%) were institutionalized.

There were 108 households, out of which 23 (21.3%) had children under the age of 18 living in them, 46 (42.6%) were opposite-sex married couples living together, 13 (12.0%) had a female householder with no husband present, 2 (1.9%) had a male householder with no wife present.  There were 7 (6.5%) unmarried opposite-sex partnerships, and 1 (0.9%) same-sex married couples or partnerships. 40 households (37.0%) were made up of individuals, and 16 (14.8%) had someone living alone who was 65 years of age or older. The average household size was 2.30.  There were 61 families (56.5% of all households); the average family size was 3.11.

The population was spread out, with 50 people (20.2%) under the age of 18, 18 people (7.3%) aged 18 to 24, 45 people (18.1%) aged 25 to 44, 82 people (33.1%) aged 45 to 64, and 53 people (21.4%) who were 65 years of age or older.  The median age was 46.7 years. For every 100 females, there were 87.9 males.  For every 100 females age 18 and over, there were 85.0 males.

The homeowner vacancy rate was 6.3%; the rental vacancy rate was 11.9%.  159 people (64.1% of the population) lived in owner-occupied housing units and 89 people (35.9%) lived in rental housing units.

2000
As of the census of 2000, there were 286 people, 120 households, and 75 families residing in the CDP. The racial makeup of the CDP was 86.01% White, 4.90% Native American, 0.70% Pacific Islander, 4.90% from other races, and 3.50% from two or more races. Hispanic or Latino of any race were 9.79% of the population.

There were 121 households, out of which 23.3% had children under the age of 18 living with them, 39.2% were married couples living together, 18.3% had a female householder with no husband present, and 36.7% were non-families. 30.8% of all households were made up of individuals, and 15.0% had someone living alone who was 65 years of age or older.  The average household size was 2.38 and the average family size was 2.91.

In the CDP, the population was spread out, with 22.0% under the age of 18, 8.0% from 18 to 24, 22.7% from 25 to 44, 24.1% from 45 to 64, and 23.1% who were 65 years of age or older.  The median age was 42 years. For every 100 females, there were 83.3 males.  For every 100 females age 18 and over, there were 79.8 males.

The median income for a household in the CDP was $26,094, and the median income for a family was $30,500. Males had a median income of $28,750 versus $16,667 for females. The per capita income for the CDP was $14,907.  About 19.8% of families and 21.3% of the population were below the poverty line, including 30.3% of those under the age of eighteen and 13.0% of those 65 or over.

Politics

See also
Klamathon Fire

References

Census-designated places in Siskiyou County, California
Census-designated places in California